Anthony Roy Stanyard (born 5 April 1938) is an English cricketer. He was a right-handed batsman and a right-arm medium-pace bowler who played first-class cricket for Essex in the 1960 season. He was born in Plaistow.

Stanyard made two first-class appearances for Essex, having made his Minor Counties Championship debut at the age of 16 in 1954 - continuing to play in the competition until 1960. His two first-class appearances came within a week-long stretch in May 1960, his second match coming against South African tourists, halfway through a Test series against England.

References 

1938 births
English cricketers
Living people
Essex cricketers